Amphibious means able to use either land or water. In particular it may refer to:

Animals 
 Amphibian, a vertebrate animal of the class Amphibia (many of which live on land and breed in water)
 Amphibious caterpillar
 Amphibious fish, a fish that is able to leave water for extended periods of time
 Amphibious insect, an insect which lives in the air or on land and breeds in water
 Amphibious rat (disambiguation)
 Scolopendra cataracta, a species of amphibious centipede

Arts and media
 Amphibious (2010 film), a thriller film
 Amphibious (2020 film), a drama film
 Amphibius (comics), a minor comic book character

Technology
 Amphibious aircraft, an aircraft capable of landing on either water or land
 Amphibious vehicle, a vehicle capable of being driven on both land and water
 Amphibious warfare, warfare carried out on both land and water

See also 
 Amphibian (disambiguation)
 Amphibia (disambiguation)